The 14th Annual Helpmann Awards for Australian live performance were held on 18 August 2014 at the Capitol Theatre in Sydney.

Winners and nominees
In the following tables, winners are listed first and highlighted in boldface. The nominees are those which are listed below the winner and not in boldface.

Theatre

Musicals

Opera and Classical Music

Dance and Physical Theatre

Contemporary Music

Other

Industry

Special Awards

Notes
A: The full producing credit for The Shadow King is Malthouse Theatre in association with the Confederation of Australian International Arts Festivals – Adelaide Festival, Brisbane Festival, Melbourne Festival, Perth International Arts Festival and Sydney Festival.
B: The full producing credit for Opus is Circa, a Nuits de Fourvière production/ Département du Rhône, coproduced with Les Théâtres de la ville de Luxembourg, GREC Festival of Barcelona, Le Cirque-Théâtre d’Elbeuf, Düsseldorf Festival, Barbican Theatre, CACCV Espace Jean Legendre-Compiegne, in association with the Confederation of Australian International Arts Festivals, Brisbane Festival, Perth International Arts Festival and Melbourne Festival.
C: The full producing credit for Black Diggers is Queensland Theatre Company and Sydney Festival in association with the Confederation of Australian International Arts Festivals, presented by Sydney Festival, Brisbane Festival, Queensland Theatre Company and Queensland Performing Arts Centre.

References

External links
The official Helpmann Awards website

Helpmann Awards
Helpmann Awards
Helpmann Awards
Helpmann Awards
Helpmann Awards, 14th
Helpmann Awards